Baïnounk Gubëeher is a minority language of Senegal, whose speakers are concentrated in Djibonker, Casamance.

Phonology

Consonants
The consonant phonemes of Baïnounk Gubëeher are as follows:

Notes
The phonemic status of geminated consonants is uncertain. There are a few words that have them, but there are no minimal pairs.
Word-final  can be pronounced as a voiceless uvular trill by some speakers.

Vowels
The vowel phonemes of Baïnounk Gubëeher are as follows:

Length is phonemic for all vowels.

References

Bibliography

External links
 Baïnounk Gubëeher DoReCo corpus compiled by Alexander Yao Cobbinah. Audio recordings of narrative texts with transcriptions time-aligned at the phone level, translations, and - for some texts - time-aligned morphological annotations.

Senegambian languages